There are a number of heritage railways in Northern Ireland, reflecting Ireland's long railway history. Some of the primary sites include:

The Downpatrick & Co Down Railway in County Down is located on part of the former Belfast & County Down Railway. Two and a half miles track has been relaid to Inch Abbey on the old route to Belfast, and a further one mile laid along the old route to Newcastle.  It operates with preserved steam and diesel locomotives and vintage wooden carriages.
The Railway Preservation Society of Ireland headquarters, in Whitehead, County Antrim. A large selection of steam locomotives and preserved rolling stock can be seen. Although there is not an actual heritage railway in Whitehead, there is a museum, and there are regular railtours with the preserved stock running to various destinations in Ireland.
The Giant's Causeway and Bushmills Railway on the north coast in County Antrim. Steam-powered services run from the Giant's Causeway to Bushmills. Laid on part of the course of the original Giant's Causeway Tramway which was electric-powered, with its own hydroelectric plant – the first such system in the world.
 The Foyle Valley Railway, in County Londonderry. The project has faced some difficulties (and is closed), but does hold a quantity of preserved railway stock, on part of one of Derry city's closed railway routes (the city once had four stations).

See also

List of British heritage and private railways
Conservation in the United Kingdom
List of Conservation topics
List of heritage railways
List of heritage railways in the Republic of Ireland
List of narrow gauge railways in Ireland
Ulster Folk and Transport Museum

External links
UK Directory of Heritage Railways
UK Heritage Railways

Northern Ireland
 List
Heritage railways in Northern Ireland
Heritage railways in Northern Ireland
Heritage railways in Northern Ireland
Cultural heritage of Ireland
Irish railway-related lists